Live at Carlos 1 is a live album by the American jazz violinist Billy Bang recorded in 1986 and released on the Italian Soul Note label.

Reception
The Allmusic review by Scott Yanow awarded the album 4½ stars stating "this melodic avant-garde set rewards repeated listenings and has an impressive amount of variety".

Track listing
All compositions by Billy Bang
 "Thank You Ma'am" - 8:33 
 "Sinawe Mandelas" - 6:57 
 "Sad Song" - 4:37 
 "Abuella" - 13:40 
 "Rainbow Gladiator" - 5:48 
 "Going Through" - 6:45
Recorded at Carlos 1 in New York City on November 23, 1986

Personnel
Billy Bang - violin
Roy Campbell - trumpet
Oscar Sanders - guitar
William Parker – bass
Thurman Barker - marimba
Zen Matsuura – drums
Eddie Conde - congas (track 4)

References

Black Saint/Soul Note live albums
Billy Bang live albums
1988 live albums